Battle of Lwow (1944) may refer to: 
 Lwów uprising – 1944 Polish uprising in Lwów (Lviv)
 Lvov–Sandomierz offensive – 1944 Soviet offensive on the Eastern Front